Alfonsas is a Lithuanian masculine given name. People bearing the name Alfonsas include:
Alfonsas Andriuškevičius (born 1940), Lithuanian poet and art historian
Alfonsas Danys (1924–2014), Lithuanian writer
Alfonsas Dargis (1909–1996), Lithuanian painter, graphic artist, set designer and poet
Alfonsas Eidintas (born 1952), Lithuanian historian, diplomat and novelist
Alfonsas Petrulis (1873-1928), Lithuanian Roman Catholic priest, journalist and signatory to the Act of Independence of Lithuania
Alfonsas Žalys (1929–2006), Lithuanian politician

References

Lithuanian masculine given names